The Daniel Pratt Historic District is a historic district that includes  and 154 buildings in Prattville, Alabama.  It is named in honor of Prattville's founder, Daniel Pratt.  The district includes the historic downtown and is roughly bounded by 6th Street in the north, Northington Street in the east, 1st Street in the south, and Bridge and Court streets in the west.  Architecture in the district includes the Greek Revival, Italianate, and Bungalow styles. It was listed on the National Register of Historic Places on August 30, 1984.

The district includes the Autauga County Courthouse. It also includes the site of the Daniel Pratt House, which was demolished in 1960 to make way for the expansion of the successor to the Pratt industrial complex.

References

External links

Historic American Buildings Survey (HABS) and Historic American Engineering Record (HAER) documentation, filed under Prattville, Autauga County, AL:
 (extensively altered)
 (demolished 1960)
 

National Register of Historic Places in Autauga County, Alabama
Italianate architecture in Alabama
Greek Revival architecture in Alabama
American Craftsman architecture in Alabama
Historic districts in Autauga County, Alabama
1906 establishments in Alabama
Historic American Buildings Survey in Alabama
Historic American Engineering Record in Alabama
Historic districts on the National Register of Historic Places in Alabama